"Asesina" is a song recorded by Argentine singer Lali, serving as the second single for her debut studio album A Bailar (2014). The song was released to digital download on March 10, 2014.  It was co-written and produced by Espósito, Pablo Akselrad, Luis Burgio and Gustavo Novello from the production company 3musica.

Background and release
"Asesina" was released as a promotional single on October 29, 2013. The song was not released as a single until March 10, 2014, when Espósito premiered its music video. The track was finally released on March 21, 2014 as part of the entire album.

Live performances
Espósito performed "Asesina" for the first time on her solo artist release event at La Trastienda on September 2, 2013. On September 11, 2014, the singer performed the song at the ninth edition of "Bailando por un Sueño". "Asesina" was part of the setlist of Espósito's worldwide tour, A Bailar Tour, serving as the opening song and the encore of the show.

Music video
The music video was uploaded to Espósito's personal YouTube channel on March 10, 2014. Argentine dancer Facundo Mazzei guests in the video. The video won in the category for "Best Choreography" at the 2014 Quiero Awards.

Awards and nominations
The song's music video won in the category for "Best Choreography" at the 2014 Quiero Awards.

References

2014 songs
Lali Espósito songs
2014 singles
Songs written by Gustavo Novello
Songs written by Pablo Akselrad
Songs written by Lali Espósito